Wildey is a surname. Notable people with the surname include:

Doug Wildey (1922–1994), American cartoonist and comic book artist
Edna Wildey (1882–1970), American tennis player 
Thomas Wildey (1782–1861), British-born American civic leader

See also
Willey (surname)